Andrew Foster may refer to:

Sports
 Andrew Foster (tennis) (born 1972), British tennis player
 Andrew Foster (footballer) (born 1985), Australian rules footballer 
 Rube Foster (Andrew Foster, 1879–1930), American baseball player, manager, and executive
 Andy Foster (born 1979), California State Athletic Commission executive

Others
 Andrew Foster (politician) (1870–1956), Canadian politician
 Andy Foster (politician) (born 1961), New Zealand politician and environmentalist
 Andrew Foster (educator) (1925–1987), missionary to the deaf in Africa
 Sir Andrew Foster (British public servant) (born 1944), British civil servant
 Andrew Foster (musician) (born 1980), British musician

See also 
 Andrew Foster-Williams, British classical singer